Ri Pyong-chol (born 1948) is a North Korean marshal and formerly a top advisor of supreme leader Kim Jong-un, who served as Vice Chairman of the Central Military Commission and a member of the Presidium of the Politburo of the Workers' Party of Korea.  He is a relative of Kim's wife, Ri Sol-ju. He currently also serves as a director of a department of the Central Committee of the Workers' Party of Korea (WPK) and First Deputy Director of the WPK Organization and Guidance Department (OGD).

General Ri's military and senior Party experience make him an important advisor to Kim Jong-un, especially during crisis. He is an alternate member of the WPK Political Bureau, and a deputy to the Supreme People's Assembly.  Ri served in the Korean People's Army Air Force until 2014 at which time he became a senior party official.

In December 2017, the U.S. Treasury department issued sanctions against him, blocking him from "any property or interests in property within U.S. jurisdiction, and prohibits [him] from transactions with American citizens".

In late 2019, Ri became a director of a department of the Central Committee of the party, possibly of the Munitions Industry Department, where he was previously the senior deputy director.

On 23 May 2020, Ri became a vice chairman of the Central Military Commission of the Workers' Party of Korea. On 13 August he also became a member of the Presidium of the Politburo of the Workers' Party of Korea. On 5 October, he was promoted to Marshal of the Korean People's Army.

Following an unspecified "serious incident" in June 2021, Ri was stripped of his military title and demoted to a junior position in the party. He was again identified as a Politburo Presidium member and secretary of the Central Committee at the celebrations for the 90th anniversary of the Korean People's Army on 25 April 2022.

Awards and honors 
During the February 8 2023 parade, Ri was seen wearing all decorations awarded to him.

References

|-

|-

|-

|-

Living people
Date of birth missing (living people)
Place of birth missing (living people)
1948 births
North Korean politicians
Members of the Presidium of the Workers' Party of Korea
Members of the 7th Politburo of the Workers' Party of Korea
Members of the 7th Presidium of the Workers' Party of Korea
Members of the 8th Presidium of the Workers' Party of Korea
Members of the 6th Central Committee of the Workers' Party of Korea
Vice Chairmen of the Workers' Party of Korea and its predecessors